Ernst Heilmann (13 April 1881 – 3 April 1940) was a German jurist and politician of the Social Democratic Party of Germany.

Born in Berlin, then in Prussia, Heilmann attended the University of Berlin and majored in law and political science.

During the First World War, Heilmann was a proponent of the German party truce (Burgfriedenspolitik). He gained a seat in the Reichstag in the 1928 German federal election. Not long after Hitler and the Nazis seized power (Machtergreifung), Heilmann was arrested by the Gestapo and imprisoned in the first of a series of concentration camps in which he was to spend nearly seven years.

From February 1937, Heilmann was kept in Dachau concentration camp until he was transferred in September 1938 to Buchenwald concentration camp, where he was executed in April 1940.

References

External links

1881 births
1940 deaths
Politicians from Berlin
Jurists from Berlin
Humboldt University of Berlin alumni
Prussian politicians
Social Democratic Party of Germany politicians
German people who died in Buchenwald concentration camp
Politicians who died in Nazi concentration camps
German civilians killed in World War II
Members of the Reichstag of the Weimar Republic